The United Progressive Alliance (UPA) is a centre-left alliance of political parties in India formed after the 2004 general election. In India it is generally considered to be rival of NDA government in formation of government at Centre. The most influential party of the UPA alliance is the Indian National Congress. Sonia Gandhi is chairperson of the UPA. It formed a government with support from some other left-aligned parties in 2004.

Current members

Past members

References

External links
 Common Minimum Programme of the UPA.
Arora, Balveer and Tawa Lama Rewal, Stéphanie. "Introduction: Contextualizing and Interpreting the 15th Lok Sabha Elections". South Asia Multidisciplinary Academic Journal, 3, 2009

United Progressive Alliance